= Podovi =

Podovi Подови
- Village
- Location within Bosnia and Herzegovina
- Coordinates: 44.2520449°N 17.7465645°E
- Country: Bosnia and Herzegovina
- Entity: Federation of Bosnia and Herzegovina
- Canton: Central Bosnia
- Municipality: Travnik

Area
  - Total: 0.88 sq mi (2.29 km^{2})

Population (2013)
  - Total: 1,076
  - Density: 1,220/sq mi (470/km^{2})
- Time zone: UTC+1 (CET)
  - Summer (DST): UTC+2 (CEST)

Podovi is a village in the municipality of Travnik, Bosnia and Herzegovina.

== Demographics ==
According to the 2013 census, its population was 1,076.

Ethnicity in 2013
Ethnicity	Number	Percentage
Bosniaks	1,051	97.7%
Croats	22	2.0%
other/undeclared	3	0.3%
Total	1,076	100%
